Rita of Armenia (10/11 January 1278 – July 1333) was an Armenian Byzantine Empress consort. 

She was the daughter of King Levon II of Armenia and Queen Keran. She was the wife of Byzantine co-emperor Michael IX Palaiologos, making her a junior empress-consort of the Byzantine Empire. In 1317, she became the only empress upon the death of the senior empress, Irene of Montferrat. She was known as Maria in Constantinople.

Marriage and children
A chronicle attributed to Hetoum II of Armenia is included in the collection known as Recueil des Historiens des Croisades. According to a passage recording her birth, Rita was the twin sister of Princess Theophane of Armenia.

The history of George Pachymeres records that Andronikos II Palaiologos began negotiations with Levon while seeking a potential wife for his son and junior co-ruler Michael IX Palaiologos. Levon offered him Rita, and the marriage took place on 16 January 1294. The bride was sixteen years old and the groom seventeen.

Rita assumed the name Maria while at the Byzantine court. They had four children:
 Andronikos III Palaiologos (25 March 1297 – 15 June 1341).
 Manuel Palaiologos, despotes (died 1319).
 Anna Palaiologina (died 1320), who married Thomas I Komnenos Doukas and then Nicholas Orsini.
 Theodora Palaiologina (died after 1330), who married Theodore Svetoslav of Bulgaria and then Michael Asen III of Bulgaria.

Empress
Rita was the junior Empress consort from 1294 to 1317. The senior was Irene of Montferrat, second wife of Andronikos II and stepmother to Michael IX. Since 1303, Andronikos II and Irene held separate courts. The senior emperor resided in Constantinople and the senior Augusta in Thessaloniki. Rita became the only Empress when Irene died in 1317.

She remained so for three years. In 1319, however, the death of her second son resulted in tragedy. Prince Andronikos maintained a mistress but suspected her of infidelity. He assigned retainers of his to wait by her house and attack whoever tried to enter. The one who approached was Manuel during night time and the retainers failed to recognize him. The second prince died by order of his older brother.

The affair seriously affected the health of Michael IX who died on 12 October 1320. Both deaths strained the relationship between Andronikos II and Andronikos III. Grandfather and grandson started a civil war that would last until the victory of the younger man in 1328. Meanwhile, the widowed Rita retired to a monastery, where she assumed the name "Xene". She would die there five years following the end of the war.

External links
Her listing in "Medieval Lands" by Charles Cawley. The  project "involves extracting and analyzing detailed information from primary sources, including contemporary chronicles, cartularies, necrologies, and testaments."

1278 births
1333 deaths
Armenian twins
Palaiologos dynasty
13th-century Byzantine empresses
14th-century Byzantine empresses
13th-century Armenian people
14th-century Armenian people
13th-century Armenian women
14th-century Armenian women
Armenian princesses
Hethumid dynasty
Mothers of Byzantine emperors